This is a detailed discography for American country musician David Allan Coe. He started his career in 1970 on SSS International Records before signing with Columbia Records and staying with the label for 15 years. In the 1990s, he released albums through several independent labels such as his own DAC Records. Most of these releases have been reissued under different names and/or cannibalized for various compilations. Overall, Coe's discography consists of 42 studio albums, 4 live albums, 1 collaborative studio album, and 1 audiobook, plus many compilation albums.

Studio albums

1970s

1980s

1990s

2000s and 2010s

Collaborative albums

Live albums

Audiobooks

Compilation albums

Singles

1960s and 1970s

1980s

Guest singles

Music videos

References

Country music discographies
Discographies of American artists